Demonte is a comune (municipality) in the Province of Cuneo in the Italian region Piedmont, located about  southwest of Turin and about  southwest of Cuneo, in the Valle Stura di Demonte.

Demonte borders the following municipalities: Aisone, Castelmagno, Marmora, Moiola, Monterosso Grana, Pradleves, Sambuco, Valdieri, Valloriate, and Vinadio.

The family name Demonte means "On the Mountain".

The 15th-century Italian fresco artist Giovanni Baleison was born in Demonte.

See also
Colle Fauniera

References

External links
 Official website

Cities and towns in Piedmont
 

it means on the mountain